Bakhshabad (also Romanized as Bakhshābād and Bekahashābād) is a village in Qohab-e Sarsar Rural District, Amirabad District, Damghan County, Semnan Province, Iran. At the 2006 census, its population was 84, in 33 families.

References 

Populated places in Damghan County